The Choppers is a 1961 American crime film directed by Leigh Jason and starring Arch Hall Jr.

Plot
A gang of teenage greasers terrorize a small community by stealing cars and stripping them for parts, then selling the parts to a crooked junkyard owner. The police and an insurance company investigator set out to break up the gang.

Cast
 Arch Hall Jr. as Jack 'Cruiser' Bryan
 Robert Paget as Torch Lester (as Robert Padget)
 Burr Middleton as Snooper (as Mickey Hoyle)
 Rex Holman as Flip Johnson (as Roye Baker)
 Chuck Barnes as Ben Shore
 Tom Brown as Tom Hart
 Marianne Gaba as Liz
 William Shaw as Police Lt. Frank Fleming (as Bill Shaw)
 Bruno VeSota as Moose McGill
 Britt Wood as Cowboy Boggs
 Dee Gee Green as Gypsy
 Richard Cowl as Torch's Father (as Richard S. Cowl)
 Patrick Hawley as Officer Jenks (as Pat Hawley)

Soundtrack
 Arch Hall Jr. - "Monkey in My Hatband" (Music and lyrics by Arch Hall Jr.)
 Arch Hall Jr. - "Konga Joe" (Music and lyrics by Arch Hall Jr.)
 Arch Hall Jr. - "Up the Creek"

See also
 List of American films of 1961
 List of hood films

References

External links

1961 films
1961 drama films
American black-and-white films
American drama films
Films directed by Leigh Jason
American auto racing films
Teensploitation
1960s English-language films
1960s American films